Sportivi Ghiaccio Cortina is an ice hockey team from  Italy. They play their home games at Stadio Olimpico del Ghiaccio, located in Cortina d'Ampezzo, Veneto. They currently play in the Alps Hockey League and formerly the Serie A.

Achievements

Serie A:
Winners (17) : 1932, 1957, 1959, 1961, 1962, 1964, 1965, 1966, 1967, 1968, 1970, 1971, 1972, 1974, 1975, 2007, 2023
Coppa Italia:
Winners (3) : 1973, 1974, 2012
Basler Cup:
Winners (1) : 1958

Players

Notable players

 Cam Keith
 Adam Munro
 Dan Sullivan

 Martin Wilde
 Jonas Johansson

 Matt Cullen

References

External links
 Official Club Website

Ice hockey teams in Italy
Alpenliga teams
Sport in Cortina d'Ampezzo
Ice hockey clubs established in 1924
1924 establishments in Italy